Cowley Wright (6 October 1889 - 18 January 1923) was an English actor.

Wright was born in Anerley, London, England and died at age 33 in London.

Filmography
 The Rocks of Valpre (1919)
 The Channings (1920)
 Ernest Maltravers (1920)
 Sybil (1921)

References

External links

1889 births
1923 deaths
English male film actors
English male silent film actors
Male actors from London
20th-century English male actors